Lists of banks are contained in the following articles:

By continent 
 List of banks in Africa – Each country in Africa has a list of banks operating in that country
 List of banks in Asia – Asia has a list of banks operating in that country
 List of banks in the Americas – Each country in the Americas has a list of banks with operations in that country
 List of banks in Europe – Each country in Europe has a list of banks operating in that country
 List of banks in Oceania – Each country in Oceania has a list of banks operating in that country

By super continent or intercontinental region 
 List of banks in the Arab world – Each Arab country has a list of banks operating in that country
 List of largest banks in Southeast Asia – Each country in Southeast Asia has a list of banks with operations in that country

Other lists 
 List of international banking institutions – List of international and multilateral financial institutions
 List of systemically important banks – List of banks deemed systemically important by at least one major regulator
 List of largest banks – List of largest banks as measured by market capitalization and total assets on balance sheet
 List of investment banks – List of investment banks and brokerages

See also

 List of oldest banks in continuous operation